Jan Elizabeth Martin (born 21 November 1959) is a retired female field hockey player from New Zealand, who was a member of the national team that finished sixth at the 1984 Summer Olympics in Los Angeles, California. She was born in Auckland.

References

External links
 

1959 births
Living people
New Zealand female field hockey players
Olympic field hockey players of New Zealand
Field hockey players at the 1984 Summer Olympics
20th-century New Zealand women
21st-century New Zealand women